Intrinsics or intrinsic may refer to:

 Intrinsic and extrinsic properties, in science and engineering
 Intrinsic muscle, in anatomy
 Intrinsic function, a function in a programming language that is dealt with specially by a compiler
 X Toolkit Intrinsics, a library